Todarodes is a genus of flying squid from the subfamily Todarodinae, of which it is the type genus. The genus contains  five species which are partially allopatric but between them their distributions encompass most of the world's oceans and seas. These squid have a funnel groove with foveola, a hectocotylised fourth arm and tentacular stalks which lack free trabeculae.

Species
The following species are members of Todarodes, with their vernacular names:

Todarodes angolensis Adam, 1962 Angolan flying squid
Todarodes filippovae Adam, 1975 Antarctic flying squid
Todarodes pacificus (Steenstrup, 1880) Japanese flying squid
Todarodes pusillus Dunning, 1988 little flying squid
Todarodes sagittatus (Lamarck, 1798) European flying squid

References

Squid
Cephalopod genera